Ariel is an  angel found primarily in Jewish and Christian mysticism and Apocrypha. The literal meaning is "lion of God". The word Ariel occurs in the Hebrew Bible at Isaiah 29:1, 29:2, What sorrow awaits Ariel, the city of David. Year after year you celebrate your feasts. Yet I will bring disaster upon you and there will be much weeping and sorrow. Ariel means an Altar covered with Blood. and 29:7, where it refers to Jerusalem. The word appears at II Samuel 23:20 and I Chronicles 11:22 as referring to "men of valor" of Moab. It appears at Ezekiel 43:16 as referring to an "altar hearth", and it appears at Ezra 8:16 as the name of a Jewish man.

Book of Enoch and John Milton
Harris Fletcher (1930) found the name Ariel in a copy of the Syncellus fragments of the Book of Enoch. Fletcher suggested that the text was known to John Milton and may be the source for Milton's use of the name for a minor angel in Paradise Lost. However, the presence of the name in the Syncellus fragments has not been verified (1938), and, reviewing for example the Dead Sea Scrolls, earlier versions of the Book of Enoch are now known to not contain the name Ariel. In Paradise Lost, Ariel is a rebel angel, overcome by the seraph Abdiel in the first day of the War of Heaven.

Pistis Sophia
In the Coptic Pistis Sophia (British Library, Add MS 5114), Jesus bids the apostles preach that they "be delivered from the rivers of smoke of Ariel."  Because of the association of Jerusalem with the name "Ariel", it is likely that this is an allusion to the fires of Gehenna (or Gehinnom), a valley near Jerusalem deemed cursed because of its association with early pagan religions (Ba'als and Canaanite gods, including Moloch) where children were sacrificed by immolation.  In later Jewish, Christian and Islamic scripture, Gehenna is a destination of the wicked and often translated in English biblical versions as "Hell". According to tradition, fires located in this valley were kept burning perpetually to consume the filth and cadavers thrown into it.

In occult and mysticism
According to the German occultist Cornelius Agrippa (1486–1535): "Ariel is the name of an angel, sometimes also of a demon, and of a city, whence called Ariopolis, where the idol is worshipped."

"Ariel" has been called an ancient name for the leontomorphic Gnostic Demiurge (Creator God). Historically, the entity Ariel was often pictured in mysticism as a lion-headed deity with power over the Earth, giving a strong foundation for Ariel's association with the Demiurge. It is possible that the name itself was even adopted from the Demiurge's Zoroastrian counterpart Ahriman (who is likely the predecessor of the Mithraic "Arimanius").

"Ariel" is sometimes associated with the better known Judeo-Christian Archangel Uriel, as for example some sources claim that the Elizabethan court astrologer John Dee called "Ariel" a "conglomerate of Anael and Uriel," though this is not mentioned where the name Anael appears in the only conversation of Dee with Barnabas Saul.

In Thomas Heywood, Hierarchy of the Blessed Angels (1635) Ariel is called both a prince who rules the waters and "Earth's great Lord." In several occult writings, Ariel is mentioned with other elemental titles such as the "3rd archon of the winds," "spirit of air," "angel of the waters of the Earth" and "wielder of fire." In mysticism, especially modern, Ariel is usually depicted as a governing angel with dominion over the Earth, creative forces, the North, elemental spirits, and beasts. Other entries in angelologies to Ariel are found in Jacques Collin de Plancy, Dictionnaire Infernal (1863) and Moïse Schwab Vocabulaire de l'Angélologie (1897).

Literature
In one of the earliest poems based on Shakespeare's The Tempest, Percy Bysshe Shelley identified Shakespeare's sprite Ariel with the poet, and the sprite's songs with poetry.

See also
 Angel
 List of angels in theology
 Uriel

Citations

General and cited references 
 Constance Briggs (1997). The Encyclopedia of Angels: An A-to-Z Guide with Nearly 4,000 Entries. Plume. .
 Elizabeth Marian Butler (1949). Ritual Magic. .
 Gustav Davidson (1967). A Dictionary of Angels: Including the Fallen Angels. The Free Press. .
 David Godwin (1994). Godwin's Cabalistic Encyclopedia. Llewellyn Publications. .
 Samuel Liddell MacGregor Mathers (1888). The Key of Solomon the King (Clavicula Salomonis). (The 1889 edition.)

External links 
 

Archangel in Judaism
Archangels in Christianity
Individual angels